A mystic is a person who practices mysticism, or a reference to a mystery, mystic craft, first hand-experience or the occult.

Mystic may also refer to:

Places

United States 
 Mistick, an old name for parts of Malden and Medford, Massachusetts
 Mystic, California, a place in Nevada County
 Mystic, Colorado, a ghost town
 Mystic, Connecticut, a village in New London County
 Mystic, Iowa, a city in Appanoose County
 Mystic, Kentucky, an unincorporated community
 Mystic, Michigan, a ghost town
 Mystic, South Dakota, an unincorporated community
 Mystic Island, New Jersey, a census-designated place
 Mystic River, a river in eastern Massachusetts
 Mystic River (Connecticut), a river in southeastern Connecticut
 Mystic Seaport, the Museum of America and the Sea in Mystic, Connecticut
 Old Mystic, Connecticut, an unincorporated community in New London County

Other places 
 Mystic, a settlement in the municipality of Saint-Ignace-de-Stanbridge, Quebec, Canada

Entertainment

Books and comics 
 Mystic (comics), a CrossGen publication
 Mystic Comics, a Timely Comics publication
 Ms. Mystic, comic book superheroine

Film and television 
 The Mystic, a 1925 film directed by Tod Browning
 Mystics (film), a 2003 film directed by David Blair
 Mystic (TV series), a 2020 television series based on the Pony Club Secrets series of books

Music 
 Mystic Production, a record label from Poland
 Mystic Records, a record label based in Oceanside, California, U.S.
 Mystic (singer) (born 1974), hip hop singer from San Francisco, U.S.
 The Mystics, a singing group which began in Brooklyn, New York, U.S.
 Digital Mystikz, an electronic outfit made up of Mala and Coki  from London, England
 "Mystic", song by Prodigy from Hegelian Dialectic
 "Mystik", song by Tash Sultana from the album Flow State

Ships 
 , two ships of the Royal Navy
 , a ship of the United States Navy
 DSRV-1 Mystic, a 1970 rescue submersible of the United States Navy

Sports 
 Northern Mystics, a New Zealand netball team
 Washington Mystics, a U.S. professional women's basketball team

Other uses 
 Mystic BBS, a bulletin board software program
 MYSTIC (surveillance program), U.S. government voice interception system
 Mystics, a race shown in the film The Dark Crystal
 Team Mystic, a team on Pokémon Go

See also 
 Sufism
 List of female mystics
 Mystic River (disambiguation)
 MISTIC, computer system at Michigan State University from 1956